The Madonna and Child with St. John the Baptist and a Female Saint or the Giovanelli Sacred Conversation is an oil painting on panel by Giovanni Bellini, dated to before 1504. It is kept in the Gallerie dell'Accademia of Venice.

History
The painting is signed by Bellini on the balustrade in the foreground. The painting is dated to before 1504, because its figure of John the Baptist was copied by Andrea Previtali in one of his own paintings. 

Its last private owner was prince Giovanelli, prior to it entering the Gallerie dell'Accademia in Venice, where it still hangs.

Description and style

The Virgin Mary sits with the Baby Jesus in her lap, flanked by Saint John the Baptist on her left and another saint at right, possibly Mary Magdalene or Catherine of Alexandria. Saint John is identifiably by his beard and the cross-bearing staff. The background displays castles, a gated city (possibly Ancona), and a countryside punctuated by houses and a shepherd with his flock. The distant mountains are painted with blue to capture a misty quality, after the Venetian rules of aerial perspective.

This panel painting is often associated with the sacra conversazione genre. The people in the foreground are separated from the background in a typical 14th century manner (as Bellini uses in his Madonna del Prato), but given atmospheric qualities thanks to the use of warm lighting. The landscape and the figures are unified through their shared use of delicate, clear tones of color.

References

Bibliography
 

1504 paintings
Paintings of the Madonna and Child by Giovanni Bellini
Paintings in the Gallerie dell'Accademia